Sharon is a village in Walworth County, Wisconsin, United States. The population was 1,586 at the 2020 census. The village is adjacent to the Town of Sharon.

History
The village is named after Sharon Springs, New York.

Geography
Sharon is located at  (42.502412, -88.729681).

Demographics

2010 census
As of the census of 2010, there were 1,605 people, 594 households, and 406 families living in the village. The racial makeup of the village was 86.7% White, 0.2% African American, 0.6% Native American, 0.4% Asian, 10.5% from other races, and 1.6% from two or more races. Hispanic or Latino of any race were 16.5% of the population.

There were 594 households, of which 38.7% had children under the age of 18 living with them, 49.5% were married couples living together, 12.8% had a female householder with no husband present, 6.1% had a male householder with no wife present, and 31.6% were non-families. 24.7% of all households were made up of individuals, and 6.4% had someone living alone who was 65 years of age or older. The average household size was 2.70 and the average family size was 3.24.

The median age in the village was 35.3 years. 28.2% of residents were under the age of 18; 8.3% were between the ages of 18 and 24; 27.7% were from 25 to 44; 27.1% were from 45 to 64; and 8.8% were 65 years of age or older. The gender makeup of the village was 50.8% male and 49.2% female.

2000 census
As of the census of 2000, there were 1,549 people, 565 households, and 402 families living in the village. The population density was 1,699.3 people per square mile (657.2/km2). There were 602 housing units at an average density of 660.4 per square mile (255.4/km2). The racial makeup of the village was 93.35% White, 0.58% Black or African American, 0.45% Native American, 0.45% Asian, 3.62% from other races, and 1.55% from two or more races. 7.30% of the population were Hispanic or Latino of any race.

There were 565 households, out of which 40.0% had children under the age of 18 living with them, 57.3% were married couples living together, 8.7% had a female householder with no husband present, and 28.7% were non-families. 25.5% of all households were made up of individuals, and 7.8% had someone living alone who was 65 years of age or older. The average household size was 2.74 and the average family size was 3.29.

In the village, the population was spread out, with 31.3% under the age of 18, 8.8% from 18 to 24, 31.2% from 25 to 44, 19.8% from 45 to 64, and 8.8% who were 65 years of age or older. The median age was 32 years. For every 100 females, there were 102.5 males. For every 100 females age 18 and over, there were 104.2 males.

The median income for a household in the village was $39,330, and the median income for a family was $45,500. Males had a median income of $34,097 versus $23,438 for females. The per capita income for the village was $15,779. About 9.5% of families and 10.4% of the population were below the poverty line, including 12.7% of those under age 18 and 18.3% of those age 65 or over.

Culture
Since 1997, the Sharon Main Street Association has organized an annual "Model A Day", a gathering of Model A collectors and enthusiasts. This event draws over 300 cars each year. Sharon is one of the greatest (by percentage) Polish-American communities in the U.S.

Notable people
 William P. Allen, Wisconsin State Representative, lived in Sharon.
 John W. Brownson, New York politician, moved in Sharon.
 John Brownson, Wisconsin State Representative, lived in Sharon. 
 Travis Frederick, NFL Player, lived in Sharon.
 Walter Samuel Goodland, Governor of Wisconsin, was born in Sharon.
Martha Nessler Hayden, painter
 Scott M. Ladd, Justice of the Iowa Supreme Court, was born in Sharon.
 Frank Mentzer, An American fantasy author and game designer best known for his work on early materials for Dungeons & Dragons, currently lives in Sharon.
 George Perring, MLB player, was born in Sharon.
 George Sykes or Sikes, former Representative and retired farmer, moved here with his wife from the Town of Sharon, and died here
 Charles W. Woodford, Illinois Treasurer, was born in Sharon.
 Riley S. Young, Speaker of the Wisconsin State Assembly, in Sharon.

See also
 List of villages in Wisconsin

References

External links

 
 Historic Downtown Sharon LLC
 Sharon Fire & Rescue
 Photographs of Sharon, Wisconsin
 Sanborn fire insurance maps: 1894 1899 1914

Polish-American culture in Wisconsin
Villages in Wisconsin
Villages in Walworth County, Wisconsin